Jacob Fawcett (April 9, 1847April 19, 1928) was an American lawyer and jurist, who served eight years on the Nebraska Supreme Court (1909–1917), and was acting chief justice in 1915.

Biography
Fawcett was born on April 9, 1847, to Joshua and Margaret Fawcett in Benton, Wisconsin. On April 16, 1868, he married Margaret J. Doxey.

Career
Fawcett was admitted to the Illinois bar and practiced law. He served on the Galena, Illinois, city council. Fawcett was County Judge of Jo Daviess County, Illinois, from 1886 to 1887. He then served in the district court in Nebraska from 1896 to 1904. Sometime around 1901 Judge Fawcett along with judge Breen purchased the Psyche gold mine in Eastern Oregon. From 1908 to 1917, Fawcett was a justice of the Nebraska Supreme Court, serving as chief justice in 1915. Fawcett served in the Union Army, in the 16th Wisconsin Volunteer Infantry Regiment, during the American Civil War. Fawcett died on April 19, 1928, in Lincoln, Nebraska.

References

|-

People from Galena, Illinois
Politicians from Lincoln, Nebraska
People from Benton, Wisconsin
Illinois lawyers
Illinois city council members
Illinois state court judges
Nebraska state court judges
Chief Justices of the Nebraska Supreme Court
Union Army soldiers
People of Wisconsin in the American Civil War
1847 births
1928 deaths
19th-century American lawyers